House of Terror is a museum in Budapest, Hungary.

House of Terror may also refer to:

The House of Terror, a (1928) William M. Pizor film
 House of Terror (1960 film)
 House of Terror (1973 film)